Simeon Masaba (born 23 March 1983) is a Ugandan footballer who plays for Ugandan Premier League club Uganda Revenue Authority SC as a defender.

Club career
He began his career with Police Jinja in the Ugandan Premier League, before moving to Villa SC in 2004. He turned back to Police Jinja in 2006 and in 2008 started a second spell with Villa SC in 2008.  Simeon Masaba who choose to join Uganda Revenue Authority on a one-year contract for Shs10m. .

International career
Masaba played currently for the Uganda national football team. He is played for 69 games and 7 goals.

External links

1983 births
Ugandan footballers
Uganda international footballers
Living people
Association football defenders
SC Villa players
2011 African Nations Championship players
Uganda A' international footballers